was a town located in Yoshiki District, Yamaguchi Prefecture, Japan.

As of 2003, the town had an estimated population of 7,801 and a density of 323.83 persons per km². The total area was 24.09 km².

On October 1, 2005, Aio, along with the town of Tokuji (from Saba District), and the towns of Ajisu and Ogōri (all from Yoshiki District), was merged into the expanded city of Yamaguchi.

External links
 Yamaguchi official website 

Dissolved municipalities of Yamaguchi Prefecture
Yamaguchi (city)
1889 establishments in Japan
Populated places established in 1889
Populated places disestablished in 2005
2005 disestablishments in Japan